George William "Tich" Shorten (19 March 1901 – 26 June 1973) was an Australian rules footballer who played for Essendon in the VFL during the 1920s.

Shorten was the lightest player in Essendon's famed "Mosquito Fleet", with estimates on his weight ranging from 47 to 51 kg, making him the lightest player in league history.

Although primarily a rover he was also seen on the half forward flanks, where he played the 1923 VFL Grand Final and was named "Best on Ground".

He also participated in Essendon's premiership the following season and in 1925 represented Victoria in three interstate matches.

Shorten finished equal second in the 1924 Brownlow Medal, one vote behind the inaugural winner Edward Greeves.

Shorten was appointed coach of St. Patrick's Football Club in the Ovens and Murray Football League in May, 1927 and lead them to a premiership in his first year. Shorten played with St. Patrick's Football Club, but did not coach them in 1928.

References

Holmesby, Russell and Main, Jim (2007). The Encyclopedia of AFL Footballers. 7th ed. Melbourne: Bas Publishing.

External links
 1928 - O&MFL runners up: St. Patrick's team photo

1901 births
Australian rules footballers from Melbourne
Essendon Football Club players
Essendon Football Club Premiership players
1973 deaths
Two-time VFL/AFL Premiership players
People from Kensington, Victoria